A vein disorder is a class of disease involving veins of the circulatory system.

Common vein disorders include:
 Varicose veins
 Deep vein thrombosis

References

Diseases of veins, lymphatic vessels and lymph nodes